Extra Width is the third album by the punk blues group The Jon Spencer Blues Explosion, released in 1993.

Track listing

The album was re-released by Mute Records in 2000 with the Mo' Width album as bonus tracks (on one single CD). The cover looks the same as the original release; however, the original front cover and track listing of Mo' Width is added as a cardboard paper.

References

External links
 

1993 albums
Jon Spencer Blues Explosion albums
Matador Records albums
Mute Records albums
Au Go Go Records albums